Anthony D. "Tony" Colacchio ( – ) was an American curler and curling coach.

As a coach of American wheelchair curling team he participated in 2018 Winter Paralympics.

Anthony Colacchio had many hobbies including golf, fishing, kayaking, carpentry and landscape work. He joined the Cape Cod Curling Club in 2000 and served as President from 2004 until 2006. He was instrumental in managing the club's building expansion, and he developed the Wheelchair Curling at the club level. For the past ten years he continued to develop and promote Wheelchair Curling, regionally, nationally and internationally. Tony achieved National Coaching Status and a Congressional Record of Honor in 2017 for his work in the field.

He died on November 7, 2018, from cancer.

Record as a coach of national teams

References

External links

 Video: 

1945 births
People from Nashua, New Hampshire
2018 deaths
American male curlers
American curling coaches